Lewis John Cook (born 28 December 1983) is an English footballer who played in the Football League for Wycombe Wanderers. A winger, he plays for Harrow Borough of the Isthmian League.

Career
Cook was born in High Wycombe, and joined Wycombe Wanderers at the age of 14, and went on to make his Football League debut for the club on 17 August 2002, as a second-half substitute in a 3–3 draw at home to Mansfield Town. He spent time on loan to Southern League clubs Weymouth and Cambridge City in early 2004, and then joined Windsor & Eton of the Isthmian League at the end of the 2003–04 season.

He followed manager Dennis Greene to Maidenhead United in February 2005, moving on to fellow Conference South side Basingstoke Town for the 2005–06 season. After a brief spell with Conference South Lewes and a loan to Worthing, in October 2006 Cook joined AFC Wimbledon, where he spent the remainder of the 2006–07 season.

Cook moved on to Staines Town, where he stayed for two seasons. After a spell on loan to Boreham Wood at the end of the 2008–09 season, he signed for Kingstonian of the Isthmian League before the 2009–10 season. and joined St Neots Town of the United Counties League on a month's loan in January 2010.

Shortly after moving on loan, Cook signed for Harrow Borough on 18 January 2010.

References

External links
 
 Profile at Chairboys on the Net, a Wycombe Wanderers fansite

Living people
1983 births
Sportspeople from High Wycombe
English footballers
Association football wingers
Wycombe Wanderers F.C. players
Weymouth F.C. players
Cambridge City F.C. players
Windsor & Eton F.C. players
Maidenhead United F.C. players
Basingstoke Town F.C. players
Lewes F.C. players
Worthing F.C. players
AFC Wimbledon players
Staines Town F.C. players
Boreham Wood F.C. players
Kingstonian F.C. players
St Neots Town F.C. players
English Football League players
Southern Football League players
Harrow Borough F.C. players
Footballers from Buckinghamshire